Tazeh Kand-e Sowlati (also Romanized as Tāzeh Kand-e Şowlatī) is a village in Quri Chay-ye Sharqi Rural District, in the Central District of Charuymaq County, East Azerbaijan Province, Iran. At the 2006 census, its population was 77, in 15 families.

References 

Populated places in Charuymaq County